The New Saraighat Bridge, also referred to as the 2nd Saraighat Bridge  is a beam bridge in India, connecting the North bank of Assam to South bank of Assam. The bridge spans the Brahmaputra River besides Old Saraighat Bridge, from Pandu, Guwahati  in the south to Amingaon to the north. The construction of the bridge started in 2007. The total length of the bridge is 1,493.58 metres and it has cost an amount of Rs 475 crore to complete the bridge. It is constructed by India's largest civil engineering company, Gammon India Limited.

The three lane road bridge was inaugurated by Union minister Nitin Gadkari in the presence of Union Minister of State for Railways Rajen Gohain, Minister of Commerce and Industry, Transport and Parliamentary Affairs Chandra Mohan Patowary, Minister of PWD , Fisheries and Excise Parimal Suklabaidya, Minister Keshab Mahanta and many other ministers on 28 January 2017.

See also
 List of bridges on Brahmaputra River

References

Bridges in Assam
Bridges over the Brahmaputra River
Transport in Guwahati